Ransford Annetey Abbey also known as Randy Abbey  is a Ghanaian media personality and sports administrator. He is the host of Metro TV morning show Good Morning Ghana, an Executive Council member of the Ghana Football Association, and president of the Kpando Hearts of Lions Football Club.

Early life and education 
He had his secondary education at the Accra Academy. Abbey studied for a certificate in Human Resource Management and Public Administration from  the Ghana Institute of Management and Public Administration (GIMPA), and an advanced certificate in Public Relations, Advertising, And Marketing from Ghana Institute of Journalism. Abbey received his MBA in General Management from the Australian Institute of Business, Australia, and was awarded his doctorate degree by the SBS Swiss Business School in Zurich, Switzerland.

Career 
As a media personality, Abbey has been the host of the morning show; Good Morning Ghana since 2002. In 2006, he doubled as the spokesperson of the Ghana Football Association, serving in this position for 8 years. In 2014 he completed the takeover of the Kpando Hearts of Lions Football Club, owning over 70% of the shares. In 2019, Abbey was voted member of the Ghana Football Association Executive Committee. He also serves as the Chairman of the Black Satellites management committee. Following the Black Satellites success in the 2021 Africa U-20 Cup of Nations, he was retained as the Chairman of the committee for a second term. Abbey has also chaired the Referees Appointment Committee and the Black Meteors Management Committee. He is a member of the Ghana Journalists Association.

Honours 
Abbey received the Order of the Volta award in 2006 in recognition of his contribution the growth and development of media in Ghana. That same year, he was awarded a Grand Medal for his role in Ghana's qualification and performance at the World Cup hosted by Germany in 2006.

Personal life 
Abbey is married with four children; two sons and two daughters.

References 

Living people
Ghanaian journalists
Recipients of the Order of the Volta
Alumni of the Accra Academy
Ghana Institute of Journalism alumni
Australian Institute of Business alumni
Ghanaian television journalists
Year of birth missing (living people)